Texperts was a UK-based mobile search service. In December 2008, Texperts was bought by the United States-based Knowledge Generation Bureau, operator of the 118 118 services, a directory services company which had also entered the SMS Any question market. The service was later renamed KGBAnswers and is now defunct.

History
Re5ult Ltd was launched initially with a subscription-based service called 'Re5ult' on a normal mobile number. However, in August 2004 the service was launched on a premium text code and rebranded as 82ASK. In 2007, Re5ult switched phone numbers and brands again, relaunching the service as Texperts on short code 66000.

Performance
A "road test" on the question "How many people were alive compared with all who had ever lived" resulted in the service answering the question in five minutes, with the closest rival answering it in twenty-two minutes. A similar question asked for "a hotel in Ireland within half an hour of Rosslare en route to Westmeath" achieved similar results.

Publications
In 2006, Texperts released the book Do Sheep Shrink in the Rain?, subtitled "Over 500 of the most outrageous questions ever asked", published by Virgin Books, . The 256 page paperback is a compilation of questions received and answered by the service.

See also
 AskMeNow

References

Companies based in Cambridge
Companies established in 2003
SMS-based question answering services
2008 mergers and acquisitions